Gilbert Bonvin (13 February 1931 – 20 July 1983) was a French football player.

Honours
French Division 1 winner 1956
French Division 2 winner 1954
Coupe Charles Drago winner (2) 1959, 1960

External links
Gilbert Bonvin player profile at footballdatabase.eu

1931 births
1983 deaths
French footballers
Olympique Lyonnais players
OGC Nice players
Grenoble Foot 38 players
RC Lens players
Ligue 1 players
Association football defenders